The Bobolice Castle is a 14th-century royal castle in the village of Bobolice, Poland. The complex is located within a semi-mountainous highland region called the Polish Jura.

History
The castle in Bobolice was built by King Casimir III the Great in the middle of the 14th century, probably in place of an earlier wooden structure. The castle was a part of the defence system of royal strongholds protecting the western border of Poland on the side of Silesia. In 1370, immediately after becoming King of Poland, Louis I the Great granted the castle to Władysław Opolczyk, Duke of Opole, as a prize for his support of the king’s dynastic plans. Nine years later Opolczyk leased the castle to Andrzej Schoen, a Hungarian from Barbalas; the new owner manned it with Germans and Czechs, who robbed local inhabitants and conspired with the Teutonic Order. Dissatisfied with their behaviour, the Polish king Władysław Jagiełło invaded Bobolice in 1396 and took over the castle with adjacent estates. From that time on, the stronghold was owned by a number of families, including Dołęga (Dołęga coat of arms), Szafrańcowie, Trestkowie, Krezowie (Ostoja coat of arms; owners from 1486) and later Chodakowscy, Męcińscy and Myszkowscy (Jastrzębiec coat of arms; owners of the neighbouring Mirów Castle). At Bobolice castle, the gentle crest Dołęga (Dołęga coat of arms), is placed above the gate stronghold.

According to 15th century chronicles, a representative of the Krezowie family captured and imprisoned his niece in the Bobolice Castle. She is still said to haunt the stronghold as a lady in white. There is also a tale about two twin brothers, owners of castles in Mirów and Bobolice. Legend has it that they dug a tunnel between the two strongholds so that they could often meet tête à tête. One day they came into possession of a big treasure – they hid it in the tunnel and put an odious-looking witch on guard to deter any potential thieves. The brothers understood each other perfectly and could go through fire and water for each other. However, their friendship was put to a difficult test, when one brother brought a beautiful girl from his war expedition. Suspecting that his twin brother may have fallen in love with the girl, he locked her in the cellar near the treasure. One day, during the absence of the witch, who was attending a witches’ sabbath at the Bald Mount, he caught the pair of lovers in the vault. He got angry, murdered his brother and bricked up the girl in the castle dungeons. The ghost of the girl is still said to haunt the castle tower.

The beginning of the decline of the castle dates back to 1587, when it was heavily devastated during the invasion of Maximilian III, Archduke of Austria, a rival of Sigismund III Vasa to the Polish throne. The castle was reconstructed by the then owners, the Krezowie family, but in 1657, during the Deluge, it was plundered and totally ruined by Swedish troops. The condition of the stronghold was so bad that when King John III Sobieski arrived here in 1683, he had to spend the night in a tent.

In the 19th century a huge treasure was found in stronghold cellars. It is supposed that its part may be stored in the legendary tunnel between Bobolice and Mirów. In 1882, after parcelling out the land, the already deserted walls were acquired by the peasant family of Baryłów. Now the castle belongs to the Lasecki family, who decided to rebuild it in 1999.

Architecture
The castle is situated on a steep rocky hill (360 m above sea level). Up till now, only the upper part of the stronghold (the residential building with at least two storeys and remnants of the cylindrical wall tower) has survived. The castle was accessible through a drawbridge over the dry moat, and the entire construction was surrounded by walls with battlements, made of local white limestone. Currently reconstruction works are under way in order to restore the entrance gate and the circumferential wall around the castle grounds.

Gallery

See also
 Castles in Poland
 Trail of the Eagle's Nests

References

Bibliography
 Leszek Marzec, Kazimierz Mazurek, Tomasz Suchecki, Wyżyna Krakowsko-Częstochowska, Warszawa 1986, .

External links

 Official website of the Bobolice Castle
 View of the castle from the drone

Castles in Silesian Voivodeship
History of Lesser Poland
Myszków County
Residences of Polish monarchs
Royal residences in Poland